Transwa is a division of the Western Australian government's Public Transport Authority. It is responsible for operating public transport in regional Western Australia. It has four train services: the Australind, which goes from Perth to Bunbury; the AvonLink, which goes from Midland to Northam; the MerredinLink, which goes from Midland to Merredin; and The Prospector, which goes from East Perth to Kalgoorlie.

Stations

See also 
 List of Transperth railway stations

References 

Railway stations
Transwa